WPLA may refer to:

 WPLA, Working Party on Land Administration of the United Nations Economic Commission for Europe
 WPLA (FM), a radio station (104.9 FM) licensed to serve La Follette, Tennessee, United States
 WLGR, a radio station (93.5 FM) licensed to serve Warrensburg, New York, United States, which held the call sign WPLA in 2021
 WSLP, a radio station (100.7 FM) licensed to serve Ray Brook, New York, which held the call sign WPLA from 2020 to 2021
 WWFK, a radio station (107.1 FM) licensed to serve Dannemora, New York, which held the call sign WPLA from 2018 to 2020
 WPLA (AM), a defunct radio station (1380 AM) licensed to serve Portsmouth, New Hampshire, United States, which held the call sign from 2016 to 2017
 WMGE (AM), a radio station (1670 AM) licensed to serve Dry Branch, Georgia, United States, which held the call sign WPLA from 2010 to 2016
 WWJK, a radio station (107.3 FM) licensed to serve Green Cove Springs, Florida, United States, which held the call sign WPLA from 2005 to 2010
 WJBT, a radio station (93.3 FM) licensed to serve Callahan, Florida, United States, which held the call sign WPLA from 1995 to 2005
 WTWD, a radio station (910 AM) licensed to serve Plant City, Florida, United States, which held the call sign WPLA from 1949 to 1990